General Motors de Chile is the Chilean subsidiary of General Motors. It is located in the city of Santiago, in the commune of Huechuraba (El Rosal).

History 
General Motors de Chile is one of the subsidiaries of the American automotive conglomerate General Motors. It was officially established in 1974, when the appearance of the brand GM Chile originated at the beginning of the brand's representation and sale operations, which subsequently, some of its models would be assembled, under the Chevrolet brand, and some of which were of Japanese origin (Chevrolet LUV Cabmax), of Opel (Opel Corsa), and others were and are currently imported from GM manufacturing plants in the region (as from the Colombia (Colmotores), Ecuador (GM OBB), Argentina, and Brazil). 

The assembly plant in Arica was closed in July 2008. Its final product was the Chevrolet D-Max pickup truck. The GM plant in Arica was the last light vehicle assembly plant in Chile. 

There is still a small factory at GM Chile headquarters in Huechuraba that assembles Isuzu N- & F-series commercial trucks from semi-knocked down kits (SKD) under the Chevrolet brand. This factory has a production capacity of 2,000 units per year, expandable to 3,000.

Models

Assemblies 
 Chevrolet Luv Cabmax
 Chevrolet Forward (Serie F)

Imported 
 Chevrolet Aveo
 Chevrolet Tacuma/Vivant
 Chevrolet Epica
 Chevrolet Sail
 Chevrolet Tracker
 Chevrolet TrailBlazer
 Chevrolet Blazer
 Chevrolet Tahoe
 Opel Corsa
 Opel Meriva

References

External links
 

Motor vehicle manufacturers of Chile
Manufacturing companies based in Santiago
General Motors subsidiaries
Vehicle manufacturing companies established in 1974
Chilean companies established in 1974